Temnopteryx is a genus of cockroaches.  The genus includes Temnopteryx phalerata, the Cape Zebra Cockroach, which is endemic to the Fynbos biome of the Western Cape province of South Africa.

References

Cockroach genera